Khairwa is a village in West Champaran district in the Indian state of Bihar. The village is situated on the banks of river Bhudi Gandak, which is tributary of river Gandak.

Demographics
As of 2011 India census, Khairwa had a population of 497 in 88 households. Males constitute 53.72% of the population and females 46.27%. Khairwa has an average literacy rate of 37.2%, lower than the national average of 74%: male literacy is 67%, and female literacy is 32%. In Khairwa, 22.33% of the population is under 6 years of age.

References

Villages in West Champaran district